Franke-Schenk is an art dealership and art gallery in Munich, Germany, which presents works of art from the 16th to the 20th centuries. The Kunstsalon came into being in 2009, after the merger of two companies.

History

Kunstsalon Franke
The Kunstsalon Franke-Schenk was founded in 1913 as the Kunstsalon Franke, by the metal goods manufacturer Willy Franke (1875 Altenburg – 1957 Leipzig). Until 1961, the art and antiques business Kunstsalon Franke was situated in Leipzig. The family company dealt mainly in paintings, specialising in Old Masters. The son Walter Franke (1901 Dresden – 1968 Baden-Baden), an art historian, joined the management in 1927. Forced to flee in 1961 because of repression in the German Democratic Republic (GDR) and the expropriation of art dealers, the Kunstsalon Franke settled in Baden-Baden.

Here, the third generation in the person of Michael Franke (1939 Leipzig – 1985 Baden-Baden) took over the management of the Kunstsalon Franke in 1967. During the 1970s Michael Franke expanded the company further and he and his wife Catherine Franke together intensified the antiques business, with additional subsidiaries for silver and furniture. In 1971 Michael Franke became chairman of the Baden-Württemberg art dealers’ association.

After his early death in 1985 Catherine Franke concentrated the art dealership on classics of modern painting. Among the artists in the gallery were Marc Chagall, Karl Hofer, Max Pechstein, Karl Schmidt-Rottluff and Alexej von Jawlensky, and in particular Lovis Corinth and Max Liebermann. In 1992 Catherine Franke organised a Max Liebermann exhibition, which she presented at Cologne and Zurich, and in Berlin, at Liebermann’s villa at the Wannsee. Through her efforts the villa was given protected monument status and the Max Liebermann Society of the Liebermann villa was founded. From this year on the Zurich Galerie Dr. Schenk and the Munich Kunstsalon Franke collaborated on joint projects.

Galerie Dr. Schenk

The Galerie Dr. Schenk was founded at Zurich in 1984. The art historian Rolf Schenk began working as an art dealer in 1979 at the Galerie Carroll in Munich. In 1981, after obtaining his doctorate in art history, he moved his area of operations to Zurich, where he worked for the Koller auction house and the Galerie Jörg Stuker in Bern. From 1984 to 1993 the Galerie Dr. Schenk dealt principally with paintings of the 18th to the 20th centuries and featured Swiss artists of international rank, such as Cuno Amiet, Albert Anker, Francois Diday, Giovanni Giacometti and Augusto Giacometti, Ferdinand Hodler and Giovanni Segantini and also Gottardo Segantini.

Kunstsalon Franke-Schenk

After collaborating on art fairs and exhibitions, the two art dealerships merged in Munich to form the Kunstsalon Franke-Schenk. Since 2010, after several changes of site within the heart of Munich, the Kunstsalon has been located at Residenzstrasse 23 in 2010. The Kunstsalon Franke-Schenk is a gallery which specialises in Old Masters and classics of modern art. Dr. Rolf Schenk is management board member of the DK (Deutscher Kunsthandelsverband e. V.).

Artists
Artists at the "Kunstsalon Franke-Schenk" (selection):

 Alexandre Calame (1810 Vevey – 1864 Menton)
 Lovis Corinth (1858 Tapiau/Kaliningrad – 1925 Zandvoort)
 André Derain (1880 Chatou/Paris – 1954 Garches/Paris)
 Jakob Philipp Hackert (1737 Prenzlau – 1807 San Piero di Careggi)
 Alexej von Jawlensky (1864 Torschok – 1941 Wiesbaden)
 Ernst Ludwig Kirchner (1880 Aschaffenburg – 1938 Frauenkirch/Davos)
 Paul Klee (1879 Bern – 1940 Muralto/Locarno)
 Max Liebermann (1847 Berlin – 1935 Berlin)
 Hans Makart (1840 Salzburg – 1884 Vienna)
 Henry Moore Henri Moore (1898 Castleford – 1986 Much Hadham/Hertfordshire)
 Emil Nolde (1867 Nolde/Schleswig – 1956 Seebüll)
 Emil Orlik (1870 Prague – 1932 Berlin)
 Auguste Renoir (1841 Limoges – 1919 Cagnes)
 Christian Rohlfs (1849 Niendorf/Holstein – 1938 Hagen)
 Jacob Salomonsz van Ruysdael (1629 Haarlem – 1681 Haarlem)
 Carl Spitzweg (1808 Munich – 1885 Munich)
 Hans Thoma (1839 Bernau/Black Forest – 1924 Karlsruhe)

Literature
 Rolf Schenk, Galerie Dr. Schenk (Zürich), Historien- und Landschaftsbilder aus fünf Jahrhunderten, Kunstsalon Franke, 2002
 Die Gemälde des Kunstsalon Franke-Schenk 1913 – 2013, 2 volumes, München 2013

External links
Homepage Kunstsalon Franke-Schenk

Art museums and galleries in Germany
Art museums and galleries in Switzerland
Companies based in Munich
Arts in Munich